2-hydroxymuconate tautomerase (4-oxalocrotonate tautomerase, 4-oxalocrotonate isomerase, cnbG (gene), praC (gene), xylH (gene)) is an enzyme with systematic name (2Z,4E)-2-hydroxyhexa-2,4-dienedioate keto-enol isomerase. This enzyme catalyses the following chemical reaction

 (2Z,4E)-2-hydroxyhexa-2,4-dienedioate  (3E)-2-oxohex-3-enedioate

Involved in the meta-cleavage pathway for the degradation of phenols, modified phenols and catechols.

References

External links 
 

EC 5.3.2